In the Philippines, a freedom park is a centrally located public space where political gatherings, rallies and demonstrations may be held without the need of prior permission from government authorities. Similar to free speech zones in the United States, the existence of freedom parks are based on the premise that the government may regulate the time, place and manner of assemblies, without prejudice to the nature of expression being expressed in those assemblies.

These spaces, of which every city and municipality is required to have at least one space designated as such, were created as a result of Reyes v. Bagatsing, a 1983 case heard by the Supreme Court of the Philippines where it was decided that there is no legal impediment to holding a rally in a public venue, which in this case was Rizal Park. This led to the enactment of Batas Pambansa Blg. 880, the Public Assembly Act of 1985, which codified the Reyes decision.

Despite the Public Assembly Act of 1985 requiring that all cities and municipalities have freedom parks, until 2006 only one freedom park was legally designated in the entire country: the Fuente Osmeña Rotonda in downtown Cebu City, according to testimony provided by Alfredo Benipayo, then Solicitor General of the Philippines, in Bayan v. Ermita. In its decision of the case, promulgated on April 26, 2006, the Supreme Court stipulated that in the absence of a freedom park in a particular city or municipality, all public spaces in that particular locality shall be open for the use of the public to peacefully assemble, with the only requirement for doing such being prior notice given to the local mayor. Most localities established freedom parks after Bayan v. Ermita was heard by the Supreme Court, following an order wherein all cities and municipalities were to establish freedom parks within thirty days of the decision's promulgation.

Freedom parks may not be closed without provisions for its relocation, under Section 21 of the Local Government Code of 1991.

List 
In 2006, the Department of the Interior and Local Government designated the following as freedom parks in Metro Manila:
 Caloocan: LRT-1 Westside in Grace Park
 Manila:
 Plaza Miranda
 Plaza Dilao
 Plaza Moriones
 Liwasang Bonifacio
 Although not officially designated a freedom park, Rizal Park (a.k.a. Luneta) is also considered as such and rallies may be held in the venue without permits.
 Makati: Paseo de Roxas corner Makati Avenue
 Marikina: Freedom Park (in front of Marikina city hall)
 Navotas: Veterans Park
 Pasig: Plaza Rizal (in front of Pasig Cathedral)
 Quezon City: Quezon Memorial Circle
 San Juan: Pinaglabanan Shrine
 Valenzuela: Park in front of Valenzuela City Hall (by 2015, this became the Valenzuela People's Park)

In 2020, the Commission on Human Rights reiterated that the University of the Philippines Diliman campus, including Liwasang Diokno outside their headquarters, is a freedom park. The Public Assembly Act of 1985 states that a "campus of a government-owned and operated educational institution" are freedom parks.

See also
 Speakers' Corner

References

Politics of the Philippines
Freedom of assembly